Cissus adnata is a woody vine species in the genus Cissus found in Asia and Australia.

Pallidol is a resveratrol dimer found in C. pallida.

References

adnata